Ogof y Daren Cilau is one of several cave systems in the Llangattock escarpment near Crickhowell in south Powys, Wales. The cave was discovered in 1957 and is one of the longest cave systems in the country.

The cave
It is one of the longest systems in the country (over 26 km) and the entrance section is long, tight and strenuous, making the trip into the further parts of the cave a serious undertaking. Its awkward  entrance crawl is a natural barrier to any casual visitor and precludes the need for a locked gate to protect it from vandals. Highlights of Daren Cilau include the Time Machine, the largest cave passage in Britain; the White Company, a set of pure white stalactites; and the Bonsai Tree, a branching helictite.

Due to the extent of the passages several kilometres from the entrance which would require trips of up to 20 hours to explore, some permanent underground camps have been established, including the Restaurant at the End of the Universe, which is some thirteen hours from the entrance.

History
The entrance to the cave was discovered in 1957 by Vic Howells. Further investigation and the removal of debris showed an entrance in which a pool of water accumulated. In the ensuing period, the water was drained away and a  passage was revealed ending in a boulder choke. The major breakthrough into the system beyond the entrance series occurred in 1984, before which the cave consisted of little more than the entrance series and several uninspiring passages. In 1986 Martyn Farr connected the Terminal Sump to Elm Hole in the next valley by cave diving.

References

External links 
 Cave description

Caves of Powys
Brecon Beacons